Kaj Borge Vollesen (born 27 January 1946) is a botanist.

Life 
Vollessen received his MSc (1975) in Taxonomic Botany and PhD (1982) in Taxonomy and Ecology from The University of Copenhagen.

Work 
He was a Principal Scientific Officer at the Kew Gardens until his retirement in 2006 and is now an Honorary Research Fellow.  His work is principally focused on the Acanthaceae and Cyperaceae families of plants.

Legacy 
He is the authority for at least 327 taxa including:

References 

20th-century Danish botanists
1946 births
Living people
21st-century Danish botanists
Botanists active in Kew Gardens